Agnes Chow Ting (born 3 December 1996) is a Hong Kong politician and social activist. She is a former member of the Standing Committee of Demosistō and former spokesperson of Scholarism. Her candidacy for the 2018 Hong Kong Island by-election, supported by the pro-democracy camp, was blocked by authorities, due to her party's advocacy of self-determination for Hong Kong.

Personal life 
Chow has described her upbringing as apolitical. Her social activism began around the age of 15, after being inspired by a Facebook post with thousands of young people agitating for change. According to Chow, her Catholic upbringing had an influence on her participation in the social movements.

In 2014, Chow attended Hong Kong Baptist University, where she studied government and international relations. In 2018, Chow deferred her final year of university studies in order to run in the Hong Kong Island by-election. Chow also renounced her British nationality, which was a qualification requirement mandated by the Basic Law.

Chow is fluent in Cantonese, Mandarin, English, and Japanese. She taught herself Japanese by watching anime. Chow has made appearances in Japanese media, interviews, and news programmes. Media outlets in Japan have referred to her as the "Goddess of Democracy" for her role in Hong Kong's pro-democracy movement.

In February 2020, Chow launched a YouTube channel, where she uploaded vlogging videos in Cantonese and Japanese. As of December 2020, Chow had over 300,000 subscribers.

On 28 June 2021, local Hong Kong media reported that Chow’s Facebook profile had been deleted. Chow didn’t respond to reporter questions on whether she deleted her profile on her own.

Early activism 

Chow first came to prominence in 2012 as the spokesperson of student activist group Scholarism. Then a student at Holy Family Canossian College, she protested against the implementation of the Moral and National Education scheme, which critics deemed "brainwashing". During a demonstration, she met fellow activists Joshua Wong and Ivan Lam. The movement successfully drew thousands of protesters gathered in front of the Central Government Complex, which led to the government backing down in September 2012.

In 2014, Chow collaborated with student organizations to advocate electoral reform in Hong Kong. Chow was a leader of the class boycott campaign against the restrictive electoral framework set by the National People's Congress Standing Committee for the 2017 Chief Executive election, which led to the massive Occupy protests dubbed the "Umbrella Revolution". During the protests, citing heavy political pressure, Chow stepped away from politics, including resigning as spokesperson of Scholarism.

Demosistō 

In the wake of Occupy, a new generation of younger, more radical democrats gained prominence and were looking to move into participatory politics. In April 2016, Chow co-founded political party Demosistō with Joshua Wong and Nathan Law, also student leaders in the Occupy protests. She was the first deputy secretary-general of the party, from 2016 to 2017. She campaigned with party chairman Law in the 2016 Legislative Council election, in which the latter was elected as the youngest-ever member of the Legislative Council. In 2017, she participated in the protest during the visit of Communist Party General Secretary Xi Jinping, in which they covered the Golden Bauhinia statue with banners. She was arrested along with Law and Demosistō secretary-general Wong.

On 30 June 2020, Chow, Law and Wong announced that they had disbanded Demosistō, which they co-founded. The announcement came just hours before Beijing passed the national security law in Hong Kong, which raised concerns of political persecution of activists. She also said on Facebook that she is no longer conducting any international advocacy work.

Legislative Council bid 
After Law was ejected from the Legislative Council over the oath-taking controversy in July 2017 and sentenced to imprisonment in August of the same year, Chow became Demosistō's candidate in the 2018 Hong Kong Island by-election. To qualify for the election, she gave up her British citizenship. On 27 January 2018, her candidacy was disqualified by the Electoral Affairs Commission on the basis of that she "cannot possibly comply with the requirements of the relevant electoral laws, since advocating or promoting 'self-determination' is contrary to the content of the declaration that the law requires a candidate to make to uphold the Basic Law and pledge allegiance to the Hong Kong Special Administrative Region."

Michael Davis, a former law professor of the University of Hong Kong, warned that Chow's disqualification was wrong and the government was on a "slippery slope". Former university law dean Professor Johannes Chan Man-mun said there was no legal basis for such a move. Basic Law Committee member Albert Chen Hung-yee said election rules were not clear that returning officers had the power to disqualify candidates based on their political views. Chief Executive Carrie Lam asserted that "any suggestion of Hong Kong independence, self-determination, independence as a choice or self-autonomy is not in line with Basic Law requirements and deviates from the important principle of 'one country two systems'." Had Chow been elected, she would have been Hong Kong's youngest-ever lawmaker, ahead of her colleague Nathan Law.

After Chow's disqualification, Demosistō endorsed pro-democracy candidate Au Nok-hin, who won the by-election. On 2 September 2019, Chow succeeded in her appeal after the judge ruled that "she had insufficient opportunity to respond to the grounds for disqualification". Since her ban was overturned by the Hong Kong Court, Au lost his Legislative Council seat as the court claimed he was not duly elected. After the ruling, Chow described the result as a "Pyrrhic victory".

Arrests and imprisonment

21 June Wan Chai case 
Chow was arrested on 30 August 2019 at her Tai Po home for allegedly participating in, and inciting, an unauthorised assembly at Wan Chai Hong Kong Police Headquarters on 21 June 2019. On the same day, many high-profile Hong Kong pro-democracy figures were arrested, including Joshua Wong, Au Nok-hin, Andy Chan, and Jeremy Tam. She was freed the same day on bail, but her smartphone, like those of her fellow arrestees, was confiscated by police. Amnesty International called the arrests "an outrageous assault" on freedom of expression.

Chow pleaded guilty to the charges on 6 July 2020, telling the media she was mentally prepared to be sentenced to imprisonment. She was formally convicted on 5 August 2020.

Agnes Chow, Ivan Lam and Joshua Wong were put in custody until a trial scheduled on 2 December 2020, after a pre-trial hearing in the West Kowloon District court, that was having place on 23 November 2020, where they pleaded guilty regarding the events of a demonstration of June 2019 outside a Hong Kong police headquarters, where, that time of June 2019, thousands of protesters had demanded investigation of use of force by the police.

She was remanded at Tai Lam Centre for Women in Tuen Mun until the trial.

On 2 December 2020, Agnes Chow was sentenced to 10 months in jail (Joshua Wong — 13.5 months, Ivan Lam — 7 months). A judge in the trial, West Kowloon Magistrate Wong Sze-lai, pronounced accusation: "The defendants called on protesters to besiege the headquarters and chanted slogans that undermine the police force". Amnesty International condemned the sentencing, saying that the Chinese authorities "send a warning to anyone who dares to openly criticise the government that they could be next".

She was initially imprisoned at the medium-security Lo Wu Correctional Institution. On 31 December 2020, local media reported that Chow had been transferred to the maximum-security Tai Lam Centre for Women (where she was previously remanded), after she was classified as a Category A prisoner.

On 12 June 2021, Chow was released from prison after serving her 6-months sentence. Some supporters gathered outside to welcome her dressed in black and with yellow masks, shouting slogans in Cantonese related to the protests.

International responses to the imprisonment

United States 
US House of Representative Speaker Nancy Pelosi issued a statement calling "China’s brutal sentencing of these young champions of democracy in Hong Kong" as "appalling". Pelosi further called on the world to denounce "this unjust sentencing and China’s widespread assault on Hong Kongers.” US Senator Marsha Blackburn also called the sentence destroying "any semblance of autonomy in Hong Kong."

United Kingdom 
UK Foreign Minister Dominic Raab issued a statement urging "Hong Kong and Beijing authorities to bring an end to their campaign to stifle opposition" in response to the prison sentences of the three pro-democracy activists.

Japan 
Japan's government spokesperson Katsunobu Kato in a regular news conference expressed Japan's "increasingly grave concerns about the recent Hong Kong situation such as sentences against three including Agnes Chow".

Taiwan 
The Overseas Community Affairs Council (OCAC) issued a statement referencing to the Mainland Affairs Council (MAC) that "the decision to imprison Joshua Wong, Agnes Chow, and Ivan Lam represents a failure by the Hong Kong government to protect the people's political rights and freedom of speech".

Germany 
Maria Adebahr, a Germany’s foreign ministry spokesperson, stated that the prison terms are “another building block in a series of worrisome developments that we have seen in connection with human and civil rights in Hong Kong during the last year.”

National Security Law case 

Following the enactment of the national security law by the NPCSC, Chow was arrested again on 10 August 2020, reportedly on charges of violating the national security law. The detainment took place amid a mass arrest of various pro-democracy figures on the same day, including media mogul Jimmy Lai. Chow's arrest sparked a worldwide social media campaign calling for her release, which also prompted statements from Japanese politicians and celebrities. She was released on bail on 12 August 2020, where she said that her arrest was "political persecution and political suppression". She concluded that she still didn't understand why she had been arrested.

Awards
Chow was on the list of the BBC's 100 Women announced on 23 November 2020.

Filmography 
 Frontline (2020). Battle For Hong Kong. 11 February 2020. As herself.

References

External links 
 Agnes Chow's channel on YouTube

1996 births
Living people
Hong Kong Roman Catholics
Hong Kong YouTubers
Hong Kong democracy activists
Hong Kong women activists
2014 Hong Kong protests
Demosistō politicians
BBC 100 Women
Prisoners and detainees of Hong Kong
Cantonese-language YouTube channels
Hong Kong political prisoners